The 1961 Kansas Jayhawks football team represented the University of Kansas in the Big Eight Conference  during the 1961 NCAA University Division football season.  Led by fourth-year head coach Jack Mitchell, the Jayhawks outscored their opponents 269 to 88. They finished the regular season at 6–3–1 (5–2 in Big 8, second), and won the Bluebonnet Bowl 33–7 over host Rice.

Senior quarterback John Hadl received 33 first place votes in the Heisman Trophy balloting; he was the first Jayhawk to receive Heisman votes and was seventh in the balloting. He was the tenth overall pick in the NFL Draft, selected by the Detroit Lions, but chose to sign with the San Diego Chargers of the American Football League.

Schedule

1962 NFL Draft

Awards and honors
John Hadl, All-American, finished 7th in Heisman Trophy voting
Curtis McClinton, All-American

References

Kansas
Kansas Jayhawks football seasons
Bluebonnet Bowl champion seasons
Kansas Jayhawks football